KEHO-LD, virtual channel 32 (UHF digital channel 29), is a low-powered Court TV-affiliated television station licensed to Houston, Texas, United States. Owned by Innovate Corp, it is a sister station to Spanish religious station KZHO-LD (channel 38). The station's transmitter is located on Clara Road north of Jacinto City.

History
The station started in 2007 as K13ZD on analog channel 13 in Beaumont, Texas, though the station never was on the air in the Beaumont area (typical of a lot of low power TV signals licensed to the Beaumont market). The call sign changed to KEHO-LP on August 28, 2008.

Citing interference from ABC affiliate WBRZ-TV (channel 2) in Baton Rouge, Louisiana, the station applied to construct its digital signal on channel 49, and that application was granted on January 27, 2010. At that time, the call sign was changed to KEHO-LD.

On July 26, 2010, the station was sold to Elva Rosa and Moises Garza for $300,000.

On January 12, 2011, the FCC approved the move of the station's transmitter to the Chase Tower in downtown Houston. This move colocates KEHO's transmitter with that of sister station KZHO-LD.

Under the ATSC standard governing PSIP, when it signs on, KEHO must display channel 24 to tuners because Ion Television affiliate KPXB-TV, transmitting on channel 24, displays channel 49 via PSIP.

Digital channels
The station's digital signal is multiplexed:

As late as January 2021, DT4 was occupied by Grit. As of August 2021, that channel is available on KPXB.

References

External links

EHO-LD
Low-power television stations in the United States
Innovate Corp.
Television channels and stations established in 2010
2010 establishments in Texas
Ion Mystery affiliates
Grit (TV network) affiliates
Stadium (sports network) affiliates